The National Museum of the Mighty Eighth Air Force is a non-profit organization with a museum facility located in Pooler, Georgia, in the western suburbs of Savannah. It educates visitors through the use of exhibits, artifacts, archival materials, and stories, most of which are dedicated to the history of the Eighth Air Force of the United States Army Air Corps that served in the European Theatre during World War II.

Among the many World War II exhibits are aircraft including a B-17 Flying Fortress bomber that can be viewed while being restored, a model of a Messerschmitt Bf 109G fighter, and a 3/4-scale model of a P-51 Mustang fighter.  Aircraft on display outside include the  B-47 Stratojet, MiG-17, and F-4 Phantom II from the post-WWII Cold War era.

History
Planning for a museum dedicated to the Eighth Air Force began in 1983. Thirteen years later, on 14 May 1996, the Mighty Eighth Air Force Museum opened to the public.

A 2003 statute named the museum as the official State of Georgia center for character education. The museum received a B-17 project from the National Air and Space Museum in January 2009. In February 2011, a fire truck that was used at Hunter Army Airfield during World War II was donated to the museum.

Areas
Major General Lewis E. Lyle Rotunda
Colonial Group, Inc. Art Gallery
Miss Sophie's Restaurant
Museum Gift Store
Memorial Garden

Aircraft on display

Boeing B-17G Flying Fortress
Boeing NTB-47B Stratojet
Boeing-Stearman N2S-3 Kaydet
McDonnell Douglas F-4C Phantom II
Mikoyan-Gurevich MiG-17

Photos

See also
List of aerospace museums

References

External links

A Road Trip to the Mighty Eighth Museum – Air & Space

Aerospace museums in Georgia (U.S. state)
Military and war museums in Georgia (U.S. state)
World War II museums in the United States
Museums in Chatham County, Georgia
Symbols of Georgia (U.S. state)